The 1982 World 600, the 23rd running of the event, was a NASCAR Winston Cup Series race held on May 30, 1982 at Charlotte Motor Speedway in Charlotte, North Carolina. Contested over 400 laps on the 1.5 mile (2.4 km) speedway, it was the 12th race of the 1982 NASCAR Winston Cup Series season. Neil Bonnett of Wood Brothers Racing won the race. 

Tim Richmond, who crashed on lap 44, was driving a car with a mock sponsorship from "Clyde Torkle's Chicken Pit Special" to tie in with the movie Stroker Ace. Due to the crash, not much footage for the movie was shot.

Background
Charlotte Motor Speedway is a motorsports complex located in Concord, North Carolina, United States 13 miles from Charlotte, North Carolina. The complex features a 1.5 miles (2.4 km) quad oval track that hosts NASCAR racing including the prestigious World 600 on Memorial Day weekend and the National 500. The speedway was built in 1959 by Bruton Smith and is considered the home track for NASCAR with many race teams located in the Charlotte area. The track is owned and operated by Speedway Motorsports Inc. (SMI).

Top ten results

Race statistics
 Time of race: 4:36:48
 Average Speed: 
 Pole Speed: 
 Cautions: 10 for 62 laps
 Margin of Victory: 2 cl
 Lead changes: 47

References

May 1982 sports events in the United States
NASCAR races at Charlotte Motor Speedway
World 600
World 600